HMS Aldborough is the name of several Royal Navy vessels:
 , a ketch launched 1691, accidentally blown up 1696
 , a sixth rate launched 1706, broken up 1727
 , a sixth rate launched in 1727, broken up 1742
 , a sixth rate launched 1743, sold 1749
 , a sixth rate launched 1756, broken up 1777
 HMS Aldborough, a  renamed

References
 

Royal Navy ship names